Miroslav Rada (born 6 August 1976) is a Czech former professional footballer who played as a defender. He played in his native Czech Republic for Sparta Prague and FK Teplice, appearing in the Czech First League more than 100 times. Rada joined Hungarian side Zalaegerszegi in 2003, but after failing to agree contract terms, he returned to play in the Czech Republic, signing for Ústí nad Labem in the Bohemian Football League in August 2003. After playing lower league football in Germany, he again returned to the Czech Republic, playing for Sokol Brozany in the Czech Fourth Division in 2010.

References

External links
 
 
 

Living people
1976 births
Association football defenders
Czech footballers
Czech Republic youth international footballers
Czech Republic under-21 international footballers
FK Teplice players
AC Sparta Prague players
FK Ústí nad Labem players
Czech First League players
Nemzeti Bajnokság I players
Czech expatriate sportspeople in Hungary
Czech expatriate footballers
Expatriate footballers in Hungary
Vasas SC players
Sportspeople from Ústí nad Labem